Toddler Story King or You'er gushi dawang, also known as King of Stories for Kindergartners, is a simplified Chinese literary publication for toddler readers.

Toddler Story King was launched in 1994 in Hangzhou with the ISSN number .

Toddler Story King was sponsored by the Zhejiang Juvenile And Children's Publishing House (浙江少年儿童出版社) and published in Chinese by the Editorial Department of Kindergarten Story King (幼儿故事大王编辑部).

References

Anime and manga magazines
Chinese-language magazines
Magazines established in 1994
Publications established in 1994
Chinese children's literature